Mynatt is a surname. Notable people with the surname include:

Elizabeth Mynatt (born 1966), American computer scientist
Jerry Mynatt (born  1968), American football player and coach

See also
Myatt
Mynett